Bathia District is a district of Aïn Defla Province, Algeria.

Municipalities
The district is further divided into three municipalities.
Bathia
Bellas
El Hassania

Districts of Aïn Defla Province